In Greek mythology, Iasis (Ancient Greek: Ἴασις means 'healing, remedy') was one of the Ionides nymphs whose spring waters were believed to cure diseases. She was an Elean naiad-daughter of the river-god Cytherus and sister to Synallasis, Pegaea and Calliphaea.

Note

References 

 Pausanias, Description of Greece with an English Translation by W.H.S. Jones, Litt.D., and H.A. Ormerod, M.A., in 4 Volumes. Cambridge, MA, Harvard University Press; London, William Heinemann Ltd. 1918. . Online version at the Perseus Digital Library
 Pausanias, Graeciae Descriptio. 3 vols. Leipzig, Teubner. 1903. Greek text available at the Perseus Digital Library.

Naiads
Children of Potamoi
Elean mythology